Carex shinnersii is a species of sedge described in 2001. It is native to North America, found in Arkansas, Kansas, Oklahoma, and Texas. 

The species is named for Lloyd Herbert Shinners.

References

shinnersii
Flora of North America